Bocking is an area of Braintree, Essex, England, which was a former village and civil parish. In 1934 it became part of the civil parish of Braintree and Bocking, which is now within Braintree District.

It forms an electoral division for Essex County Council elections, and gives its name to Bocking Blackwater, Bocking North and Bocking South wards of Braintree District Council.

History
In 1290 on 16 September, Bocking was visited by the Archbishop of Canterbury, John of Peckham, who there ordained to the priesthood William of Louth, bishop-elect of Ely.       

In 1381, on 4 June, Bocking was the site of the first sit-down discussions between rebels leading to the full Peasants' Revolt, and the subsequent march towards London.  

The Deanery Church of St Mary, Bocking, is mainly 15th- and 16th-century flint and limestone, with 19th-century restoration, built on a more ancient church site. It is Grade I listed. St Peter's Parish Church was built in 1896-97 of yellow brick, in a design intended to be extended at a later date, and is still unfinished; its website describes it as "unusual in appearance from the outside".

Bocking Windmill is a preserved 18th-century post mill and is Grade I listed. It is owned by Braintree District Council and run by the Friends of Bocking Windmill.

In 1862 Kelly's Directory of Essex already stated that "Braintree and Bocking, although distinct parishes, form one continuous town, extending for a mile on the road between Chelmsford and Halstead, and the rivers Blackwater and Podsbrook, and having a united population in 1861 of 8,186."

Education
Bocking has one school called Bocking Church Street School. It used to have another school called Edith Borthwick School but that moved to Springwood Drive in Braintree in September 2015 because its old school in Bocking was too small.

Bocking in 1870-72
The Imperial Gazetteer of England and Wales gave the following description of Bocking in 1870-1872:

H. G. Wells on Bocking

H. G. Wells, in his What Is Coming? A European Forecast (1916), in the fourth chapter, "Braintree, Bocking, and the Future of the World," uses the differences between Bocking and Braintree, divided, he says, by a single road, to explain the difficulties he expects in establishing World Peace through a World State.

References

Further reading

Hoffman, Ann Bocking Deanery: The Story of an Essex Peculiar (Phillimore, 1976 )
Published histories of Braintree & Bocking include:
May Cunnington & Stephen Warner Braintree & Bocking (Arnold Fairbairns, 1906) 
W. F. Quin A History of Braintree & Bocking (Lavenham Press, 1981) 
Michael BakerThe Book of Braintree & Bocking (Barracuda Books, 1981, ; Baron Books 1992);
John Marriage Braintree & Bocking A Pictorial History (Phillimore, 1994).

Populated places in Essex
Former civil parishes in Essex
Braintree District